Ascensión District is one of nineteen districts of the province Huancavelica in Peru.

Geography 
The Chunta mountain range traverses the district. Some of the highest peaks of the district are  listed below:

See also 
 Kachimayu

References